Walter Bruchhausen (May 29, 1892 – October 11, 1976) was a United States district judge of the United States District Court for the Eastern District of New York from 1953 to 1976 and its Chief Judge from 1959 to 1962.

Education and career

Born in Brooklyn, New York, Bruchhausen received a Bachelor of Laws from New York University School of Law in 1912, and then entered the United States Military, serving in World War I. He was in private practice of law in New York City from 1919 to 1953, and was also a member of the New York State Judicial Council from 1950 to 1953.

Federal judicial service

Bruchhausen was nominated by President Dwight D. Eisenhower on April 18, 1953, to a seat on the United States District Court for the Eastern District of New York vacated by Judge Harold Maurice Kennedy. He was confirmed by the United States Senate on May 7, 1953, and received his commission the next day. He served as Chief Judge from 1959 to 1962. He assumed senior status on May 20, 1967, and died on October 11, 1976.

References

Sources
 

1892 births
1976 deaths
Judges of the United States District Court for the Eastern District of New York
United States district court judges appointed by Dwight D. Eisenhower
20th-century American judges
People from Brooklyn
New York University School of Law alumni